Jenny Lee Bakery was a prominent bakery in McKees Rocks, Pennsylvania, near Pittsburgh.

The bakery was founded in 1938 by cousins Paul Baker and Bernard McDonald. The name came from the song "Sweet Jenny Lee from Sunny Tennessee", which was playing on the radio while the pair was traveling to a business meeting. It closed in 2008.

In 2009, several members of the family restarted the company under the name 5 Generation Bakers. The new version sells baked goods to local retailers such as the supermarket Giant Eagle.

References

External links
Jenny Lee Bakery, former website
5 Generation Bakers

Restaurants in Pennsylvania
Companies based in Allegheny County, Pennsylvania
Bakeries of the United States
Cuisine of the Mid-Atlantic states
American companies established in 1938
1938 establishments in Pennsylvania
Food and drink companies established in 1938
Food and drink companies disestablished in 2008
2008 disestablishments in Pennsylvania